Whittemore House (also known as the Walter D. Wilcox House and the John C. Weeks House) is an historic building located at 1526 New Hampshire Avenue, N.W., in the Dupont Circle neighborhood of Washington, D.C.  The former private residence, whose previous occupants include a musician, several politicians, and a mountain explorer, now serves as a historic house museum and headquarters of the Woman's National Democratic Club (WNDC).

History
The Shingle style home was designed by local architect Harvey L. Page in 1892 and completed two years later.  The original owner was opera singer Sarah Adams Whittemore, the daughter of Reverend Henry Adams, a descendant of President John Adams.

In addition to Whittemore, past occupants include Senator John F. Dryden (1903), railroad entrepreneur and chairman of the Isthmian Canal Commission Theodore P. Shonts (1906-1907), and Representative John W. Weeks (1907-1911).  In 1907, Canadian Rockies explorer Walter Wilcox inherited the house, and lived there from 1911 to 1926.  The following year the home was purchased by the WNDC.  In 1967, the addition of a ballroom on the Q Street side of the building was completed.  The concrete Modernist expansion was designed by architect Nicholas Satterlee, whose work includes Holmes Run Acres.

The Whittemore House was added to the National Register of Historic Places in 1973, and is designated as a contributing property to the Dupont Circle Historic District.

Current usage
In addition to serving as the WNDC's clubhouse, Whittemore House is home to the Woman's National Democratic Club Museum, which features memorabilia from various Democratic political campaigns, photographs, antique furnishings from the Gilded Age, and art exhibits.

See also
 List of museums in Washington, D.C.
 List of women's club buildings
 National Register of Historic Places listings in the upper NW Quadrant of Washington, D. C.

References

External links

 thewhittemorehouse.com, official site
 democraticwoman.org, official site of the Woman's National Democratic Club

Clubhouses on the National Register of Historic Places in Washington, D.C.
Dupont Circle
Historic house museums in Washington, D.C.
Houses completed in 1894
Houses on the National Register of Historic Places in Washington, D.C.
Individually listed contributing properties to historic districts on the National Register in Washington, D.C.
Modernist architecture in Washington, D.C.
Shingle Style architecture in Washington, D.C.
Shingle Style houses
Women's club buildings
Women in Washington, D.C.